Anne Elizabeth Gell (born 1963) is a British Church of England priest: she is the  Archdeacon of Wells.

Gell was educated at St Hugh's College, Oxford and the Royal Free Hospital School of Medicine. After several years working as a doctor she studied for ordination through the Southern Theological Education and Training Scheme. After a curacy at All saints, Headley, Surrey she was the Vicar of Wrecclesham from 2005; and Area Dean of Farnham from 2010.

References

1963 births
Archdeacons of Wells
Living people
21st-century English Anglican priests
Alumni of the UCL Medical School
Alumni of St Hugh's College, Oxford
20th-century English medical doctors
Women Anglican clergy